For the 1989 Vuelta a España, the field consisted of 189 riders; 143 finished the race.

By rider

By nationality

References

 Cyclists
1989